In many Islamic and Islam-related traditions, Azazil (Arabic: عزازيل ʿAzāzīl, also known as Arabic: حارث Ḥārith) is the legendary prototype of the devil in Islamic culture. Azazil was considered to be among the nearest to God's throne, but because he sinned through pride, he became a devil.

In Islamic tradition, Azazil is usually seen as the original name of Iblis, before he was expelled from heaven. Although Azazil is mostly portrayed as an archangel, who was already created when God made the jinn, in some reports Azazil is considered created as a jinni first but elevated to the rank of the angels. 

Drawing from Turkic Sufi sources, ʿAzāzīl was neither an angel nor a jinn, but an undefined being. He grew up pious and was lifted up to live with the angels in the first heaven. Then he was sent by God to the jinn on earth to persuade them to follow the right path. Since most jinn didn't listen, they were, except for ʿAzāzīl and a few pious jinn, burned by God's fire. However, since ʿAzāzīl's piety increased he was bestowed with angelic qualities and placed in the seventh heaven, until he became proud of his achievements and refused to prostrate himself before Adam.

In some mystical interpretations of Islam, like Sufism, Ismailism and Alevism, Azazil's fall happened before the creation of the world and he therefore, becomes the originator or prototype of sin in this world.

Etymology and naming
The name is derived from  Azazel, a fallen angel in the Apocalypse of Abraham. Here, Azazel is said to have lost his former glory as a servant of God to humans.

Islamic philologists construct his name to the words aziz and il (God's dear), depicting him as God's once favorite angel.

According to many Arabic scholars, Azazil was the personal name of Satan (Iblis). Ibn Manzur (June–July 1233 – December 1311/January 1312) writes in his dictionary of the Arabic language:

Quranic exegesis 
According to many Classical scholars, based on the reports of the Sahaba, before Iblis was expelled from heaven, he was called Azazil. Quranic exegesis offers two different depictions of Iblis. One with Azazil beginning as a noble angel who later loses his position, while the other counts him as an ignoble jinn, who works his way up to heaven. According to whose interpretations legitimated by the authority of Ibn Abbas, Azazil was the leader of angels and sent by God to terminate the jinn, who lived on earth before humanity. After his victory, he grew arrogant and declined God's command to prostrate himself before Adam. Arguing that he was superior to humans, God expelled him from heaven and he became an accursed shaitan (Shaitan Rajim). When the Quran refers to Iblis as one of the jinn, this tradition states it does not refer to Azazil being one of the jinn who lived on earth, but to a group of angels who were entrusted with the task to guard the entrance to Jannah. Therefore, it is their relation to Jannah the term refers to Satan as a jinn in Quran.

Another tradition, by Ubay ibn Ka'b, who claimed to have found it in the Torah, states the jinn were angelic creatures, who descended to earth and became endowed with sexual desires. They stayed pious for a while, but started to murder, drink wine, and cause injustice on earth. Azazil parted from his community and committed his life to the worship of God in isolated places. Soon, Azazil was chosen to send messengers to the jinn community, but every time Azazil sent one, the jinn killed the messenger. When God sent down an army of angels under the command of Azazil to defeat their corrupted fellows. In yet another tradition, asserted by the Brethren of Purity, Azazil used to be a jinni from earth, but was taken captive by the angels during war. Among the angels, Azazil impressed the angels by his piety and joined them in worship and service, but loses his angelic state after he disobeys God.

Sufism
In Sufism Azazil is one of the worst tempters. The fallen angel is the devil who leads the saints astray, however, fails against the prophets. Inayat Khan, who was a pioneer of the transmission of Sufism to the West, states that evil actions performed by people attract this spirit who in turn leads them further astray into darkness and wrong actions.

Al-Hallaj mentioned Azazil in his collection Tawasin. Here, Azazil's disobedience to refuse God's command is a way to hallow His name. Chapter Six is dedicated to the self-defence of Azazil, and in one section Hallaj explains how each of the letters of Azazil's name relate to his personality. Unlike many other Sufi writers, Hallaj declined that Azazil will be restored to God's grace, thus after the Day of Judgment, he will still be damned. Since Azazil originated from fire, fire will be his final destiny.

Azazil is also mentioned three times in Rumis Masnavi, emphasizing the importance of discipline and humility:
 Through discipline and humility this heaven has been filled with light, and through discipline the angel became immaculate and holy. By reason of irreverence, the sun was eclipsed, and insolence caused Azazil to be turned back from the door. When Azazil acted arrogantly, he was abandoned to hell in spite of his former high position.

According to Al-Jili God created, out of the light of Muhammad the good angels, reflecting God's attributes of beauty, light and guidance. Azazil and his angels were created as reflecting God's names of majesty, darkness and misleading. Azazil worshipped God for thousands of years before the creation of the world and it was forbidden to him to worship anything else. As an angel of single-minded devotion, Azazil fails to realize that bowing before Adam in accordance with God's command, is equal as bowing to God himself. After getting rebuked by God, Azazil does not repent but accepts his punishment as part if his unchanging nature of fire and becomes the principle of evil.

Ismailism
In Umm al-Kitab, an 8th-century Ismaili work, Azazil is the first creation of God, the High King. God gave him the power of creation, but Azazil boasted with his loaned power, claiming divinity for himself, describing himself as another God beside the High King. To prove that Azazil's creation only depends on the power of his own creator, God makes a new creation, opposed by Azazil. Every time, Azazil again claims to be like God, he and his fellow angels lose colour, becoming darker and inferior and are thrown into lower celestial spheres until they end up on earth, which is made out of the essence of Azazil's creations. As with the Gnostic Demiurge, Azazil traps the life-forces of the heavenly realm and captures them in the material realm.

Umm al-Kitab's depiction of Azazil might be a reaction to religious dualism. By claiming divinity for himself, but getting rebuked by God and presenting Azazil merely as an angel inferior to God, belief in two eternal principles is rejected. In one instance, Ahriman, the Zorastrian creator of evil, appears namely as a later incarnation of Azazil.

Bektashi Alevism 
Azazil features as one of the first angels in an Alevi oral tradition, there he is informed by the archangel Cebrail (Gabriel), about their creator. Along with the other archangels, Cebrail leads Azazil to a lamp with seven doors. They shall serve here for 1001 days, so the door will open. After the archangels entered the lamp, they saw two lights forming one body. The archangels were commanded to prostrate before the light. All followed the order but Azazil, who refused to prostrate himself, since the light, as something that was created, could not be the creator, so he turned back to the door to stay in the former service of God. This narration explains that Azazil stood at God's service, but he despised that he saw when the door opened and decided to move into the Ego World, causing the later enmity between Satan and humanity.

See also
 List of angels in theology

References

Archangels in Islam
Jinn
Satan